George Garratly (October 1888 – 1929) was a footballer who played in the Football League for Wolverhampton Wanderers. Garratly guested for Stoke in 1918–19, making ten appearances.

Career statistics
Source:

References

1888 births
1929 deaths
Sportspeople from Walsall
Association football defenders
English footballers
Bloxwich Strollers F.C. players
Walsall F.C. players
Wolverhampton Wanderers F.C. players
Hednesford Town F.C. players
English Football League players
Stoke City F.C. wartime guest players